Bid Khvar (also Romanized as Bīd Khvār; also known as Bād-e Khvār, Bīda Khar, Bīdeh Khvār, and Bid Khar) is a village in Jam Rural District, in the Central District of Jam County, Bushehr Province, Iran. At the 2006 census, its population was 141, in 32 families.

References 

Populated places in Jam County